Gunslugs is an action and 2D shooter video game. It was released by Dutch developer OrangePixel in 2013 for iOS, Android and Ouya, in 2014 for PlayStation Vita, in 2015 for Microsoft Windows, OS X, and Linux, in 2016 for Nintendo 3DS, and in 2020 for Nintendo Switch.

Synopsis 
The storyline of Gunslugs follows the adventures of a group of slugs who are attempting to find more information about the mysterious Black Duck army, and what their goals are. The army is waging war, and it's the players job to stop them.

Gameplay 
The game's graphics are pixelated and its audio and gameplay are very retro. The goal of the game to kill all of the enemies, and progress through the various levels as the player shoots enemies and crates and drops ammo pickups, and different weapons, such as flamethrowers, egg guns, and dual-wielding pistols of which the player uses to shoot in front of or behind them.

Reception 

The iOS and PlayStation Vita versions received "favourable" reviews, while the 3DS and Switch versions received above-average reviews, according to the review aggregation website Metacritic.

The iOS version had moderate sales, with the creator reporting 10,811 sales within the first 9 weeks of launch, and an additional 150,000 downloads of a free version.

References

External links 
 
 

2013 video games
Action video games
Android (operating system) games
IOS games
Linux games
MacOS games
Nintendo 3DS games
Nintendo Switch games
Ouya games
PlayStation Vita games
Run and gun games
Single-player video games
Video games developed in the Netherlands
Windows games